Morgan Phillips (born 23 June 1984) is a British tennis coach and former professional male tennis player from Croydon. He reached a peak world ranking of 406 in May 2010.

Career

2003

Phillips joined the senior tour.

2006

Phillips beat James Ward at the Spain Futures in the first round.

2009
Phillips came back from a career threatening knee injury to jump 1,441 places in the world rankings to 431, and become the biggest mover in the British men's game in 2009.

2010

Phillips played doubles with the Russian player Evgeny Donskoy at the Seville Challenger, losing in the first round.

2012

Phillips retired from playing with a singles ranking of 581 and a doubles ranking of 1183.

2013
Phillips starts coaching Evgeny Donskoy.

Donskoy made his Davis Cup debut in Europe/Africa Zone Group I match against Great Britain in Coventry. Donskoy won an epic first rubber against James Ward, one of Phillips' best friends, 4–6 4–6 7–5 6–2 8–6 to help give Russia a 2–0 lead heading into the doubles rubber the following day. Great Britain won the doubles to give the home side some hope going into the final day of matches, where Ward opened the day. Ward stunned the much higher seeded Russian Dmitry Tursunov 6–4 5–7 5–7 6–4 6–4 to level the tie. Dan Evans ranked 325 would eventually complete a remarkable turnaround, with a straight sets victory over world no. 80 Donskoy. The last time Great Britain had come from 2-0 down to win a Davis Cup tie was 83 years ago against Germany. Consequently, Great Britain won a place in the 16-team World Group play-offs in September.

2015
On 4 December, Phillips became the new coach of James Ward, one of his best friends.

References

Living people
1984 births
Place of birth missing (living people)
English tennis coaches
English male tennis players
British male tennis players
Tennis people from Greater London